Stewart Stevenson is a Scottish politician.

Stewart Stevenson may also refer to:

 Stewart Stevenson Moore, Manx advocate, First Deemster and Clerk of the Rolls
 Stewart (Beavis and Butt-head), a fictional character
 Stewart & Stevenson, a company in Houston, Texas

See also
 Stewart (disambiguation)
 Stevenson